Katerina Zhidkova (born 28 September 1989) is a Ukrainian-born Azerbaijani volleyball player who plays for Greek club AEK and the Azerbaijani national team.

She participated at the 2017 Women's European Volleyball Championship.

References

External links
 

1989 births
Living people
Sportspeople from Cherkasy
Ukrainian women's volleyball players
Azerbaijani women's volleyball players
Ukrainian emigrants to Azerbaijan
Naturalized citizens of Azerbaijan
Opposite hitters
Azerbaijani expatriate sportspeople in Romania
Expatriate volleyball players in Romania
Volleyball players at the 2015 European Games
European Games competitors for Azerbaijan